Sugar Creek is a  long 4th order tributary to French Creek in Venango County, Pennsylvania that rises in Crawford County, Pennsylvania.

Course
Sugar Creek rises on the Muddy Creek divide about 0.5 miles south of Altenburg Corners, Pennsylvania in Crawford County.  Sugar Creek then flows south to meet French Creek at Sugar Creek, Pennsylvania in Venango County.

Watershed
Sugar Creek drains  of area, receives about 44.7 in/year of precipitation, has a topographic wetness index of 450.73, and has an average water temperature of 7.88 °C.  The watershed is 67% forested.

See also 
 List of rivers of Pennsylvania
 List of tributaries of the Allegheny River

References

Additional Maps

Rivers of Crawford County, Pennsylvania
Rivers of Venango County, Pennsylvania
Rivers of Pennsylvania
Tributaries of the Allegheny River